Tring was a hundred occupying an area now compromised by Dacorum, Hertfordshire. Tring hundred was absorbed by Dacorum in the 16th century.

Tring contained the following settlements prior to being unified with Dacorum:

 Aldbury
 Great Berkhampsted
 Little Gaddesden
 Hemel Hempstead
 King's Langley
 Puttenham
 Redbourn (partial)
 Shenley
 Wigginton
 Great Gaddesden (partial)

See also 

 List of hundreds of England and Wales § Hertfordshire
 List of lost settlements in Hertfordshire

References 

History of Hertfordshire
Hundreds of Hertfordshire